Solanum viarum, the tropical soda apple, is a perennial shrub native to Brazil and Argentina with a prickly stem and prickly leaves.  The fruit is golf-ball-sized with the coloration of a watermelon. It is considered an invasive species in the lower eastern coastal states of the United States and recently on the Mid North Coast of Australia.

Synonyms
This species has several synonyms, one of which is particularly ambiguous:
 Solanum chloranthum DC.
S. chloranthum as described by  Poeppig based on Otto Sendtner in von Martius is now S. velutinum
S. chloranthum as described by Philipp Salzmann based on Dunal in de Candolle is now S. agrarium
S. chloranthum as described by C.P.J. Sprengel is now S. arenarium as described by Otto Sendtner
 Solanum khasianum var. chatterjeeanum Sengupta & Sengupta
S. khasianum proper is now S. aculeatissimum as described by Nikolaus Joseph von Jacquin.
 Solanum viridiflorum Schltdl.
Not to be confused with S. acuminatum var. viridiflorum, which is now S. caavurana.

Introduction and control
Solanum viarum is native to Brazil and Argentina, and was first discovered in the United States in 1988, having probably been introduced through contaminated seed or other agricultural products. It crowds out native species and forage for livestock
 Its habitat is terrestrial, in fields, rights-of-way, and open forest. It is spread by livestock and wildlife, such as raccoons, deer, feral hogs, and birds feeding on fruits.

It is classified as a noxious weed or plant in Alabama, Florida, Mississippi, North Carolina, Texas, and Vermont, and in California and Oregon it’s a quarantine pest. It is a prohibited noxious weed in Arizona and Minnesota; Prohibited in Massachusetts; and a plant pest in South Carolina and Tennessee. It is also listed as a tier 1 noxious weed in Virginia, along with giant hogweed.

Since its introduction into the U.S., tropical soda apple has spread rapidly, and currently infests an estimated one million acres of improved pastures, citrus groves, sugarcane fields, ditches, vegetable crops, sod farms, forestlands (oak hammocks and cypress heads), natural areas, etc. in Alabama, Florida, Georgia, and Mississippi. Although it can be a threat to a variety of habitat, it tends to be most problematic in pastures in the Mid South.

It is controlled by triclopyr herbicide. Gratiana boliviana, the tropical soda apple leaf beetle, has been used successfully as an agent of biological pest control to reduce the abundance of this plant in the United States, particularly in Florida.

Flowering
The mature fruits are smooth, round, yellow and ¾ to 1¼ inches in diameter with a leathery-skin surrounding a thin-layered, pale green, scented pulp and 180 to 420 flattened, reddish brown seeds. Each plant is capable of producing 200 or more fruit per year. Tropical Soda Apple (Solanum viarum) usually grows to 3–6 ft tall.

References

External links

 Global Invasive Species Database.
 Species Profile - Tropical Soda Apple (Solanum viarum). National Invasive Species Information Center, United States National Agricultural Library.

viarum
Flora of Brazil
Flora of Argentina